Currajong is a suburb in the City of Townsville, Queensland, Australia.

History
Currajong is situated in the traditional Wulgurukaba Aboriginal country.
The name Currajong is believed to be derived from the name of the residence Currajong in Stagpole Street, West End, owned by Edward Hunt. In about 1888 Hunt planted currajong trees in the grounds.

St John Fisher's Christian Brothers College opened in 1952. It closed on 11 December 1987 to be amalgamated with other Catholic schools, St Margaret Mary’s Primary School (Hermit Park) and Holy Family School (Gulliver) to create The Marian School which opened on 21 January 1988. In 1995, St Mary’s Catholic Primary School (West End) was amalgamated into The Marian School.

Currajong State School opened on 28 June 1954. The school is now within the neighbouring suburb of Gulliver.

Education 
Marian Catholic School is a Catholic primary (Prep-6) school for boys and girls at 140 Corcoran Street. In 2018, the school had an enrolment of 372 students with 24 teachers (19 full-time equivalent) and 20 non-teaching staff (11 full-time equivalent).

Amenities 
Townsville Wesleyan Methodist Church is at 73 Palmerston Street (corner of Hugh Street). It is part of the Wesleyan Methodist Church.

References

External links
 

Suburbs of Townsville